Michael Oliver (born 16 November 1957) is a Scottish former professional football player and manager.

Career
Oliver  had successful spells at QOS and Albion Rovers, winning the Division 2 championship. After retiring as a player, Oliver was appointed manager of Albion Rovers in 1991. He also worked as assistant manager to Gordon Dalziel at Ayr United, where he was building a growing reputation as a coach and especially in developing young players. Oliver then moved to be general manager at Clydebank.

Since leaving the latter of those positions, Oliver has built up a great reputation in the area of player identification and has worked as a scout for Dundee United, Wigan Athletic and Birmingham City. Oliver was hired by the Scottish Football Association after Craig Levein was appointed as national team manager. Levein explained at the time of Oliver's appointment that he wanted to inform his players about all of their opponents, which necessitated the hiring of a full-time scout.

References

External links
 

1957 births
Living people
Sportspeople from Kirkintilloch
Association football defenders
Scottish footballers
Falkirk F.C. players
Cowdenbeath F.C. players
Queen of the South F.C. players
Stenhousemuir F.C. players
Albion Rovers F.C. players
Stranraer F.C. players
East Stirlingshire F.C. players
Arbroath F.C. players
Scottish Football League players
Scottish football managers
Albion Rovers F.C. managers
Scottish Football League managers
Clydebank F.C. (1965) non-playing staff